Pennsylvania Route 642 (PA 642) is a  state highway located in Union, Northumberland, Montour, and Columbia Counties in Pennsylvania.  The western terminus is at the intersection of Third Street and Broad Street in West Milton near an interchange with U.S. Route 15 (US 15).  The eastern terminus is at PA 254 and PA 44 in Jerseytown.

Route description

PA 642 begins at a signalized intersection where Third Street (designated SR 1101 by the Pennsylvania Department of Transportation (PennDOT)) and Broad Street (SR 1004) in the community of West Milton in Kelly Township, Union County. The intersection is located just east of an interchange with the US 15 freeway. Third Street is a former section of US 15 and is used to access the northbound lanes of the freeway. PA 642 heads east on two-lane undivided Broad Street. The road passes through residential areas with some businesses before crossing a Union County Industrial Railroad line. The route crosses the West Branch Susquehanna River into the borough of Milton in Northumberland County, where the road becomes Mahoning Street and heads onto Montgomery Island, which contains Milton State Park. On the island, the road briefly becomes a divided highway and comes to a right-in/right-out access point to the state park. PA 642 crosses to the east bank of the river and heads southeast through commercial areas, intersecting a one-way pair that carries PA 405. The road crosses Norfolk Southern's Buffalo Line and heads through residential areas. The route enters Turbot Township and runs past more homes, coming to an interchange with the PA 147 freeway. Past this interchange, PA 642 crosses into East Chillisquaque Township and becomes an unnamed road, heading through agricultural areas with some woods and homes. The road turns east and heads through Pottsgrove before crossing the Chillisquaque Creek.

PA 642 continues into Liberty Township in Montour County and becomes Liberty Valley Road, running through more open agricultural areas with some residences. The road heads into woodland and intersects the eastern terminus of PA 45, continuing through a mix of farmland and woods with homes. The route heads through more rural areas, crossing into Valley Township and passing through the residential community of Mausdale before intersecting PA 54. A park and ride lot is located east of this intersection. Here, PA 642 turns southeast to form a concurrency with PA 54 on Continental Boulevard, a four-lane divided highway. PA 642 splits from PA 54 by heading northeast on two-lane undivided Jerseytown Road. The road heads through farmland and woodland with some homes, passing over I-80. The route continues north into more forested areas with some fields and residences, becoming the border between Derry Township to the west and West Hemlock Township to the east. PA 642 turns northeast to fully enter West Hemlock Township and runs through more agricultural and wooded areas with occasional homes. The road heads into Madison Township in Columbia County and becomes Danville Road, heading through more wooded areas with some fields, reaching an intersection with PA 44. The route continues north concurrent with PA 44, heading through open agricultural areas with occasional residences and businesses. The road turns northwest and intersects PA 254 in Jerseytown, where PA 642 ends and PA 44 continues northwest.

History

PA 642 was created in the 1950s replacing the route of PA 115 between West Milton and Jerseytown. No major changes have occurred to the routing since then.

Major intersections

See also

References

External links

Pennsylvania Highways: PA 642

642
Transportation in Union County, Pennsylvania
Transportation in Northumberland County, Pennsylvania
Transportation in Montour County, Pennsylvania
Transportation in Columbia County, Pennsylvania